Roberto Agustín Alderete Céspedes (born 28 August 1990) is a Chilean former footballer who played as an attacking midfielder. Besides Chile, he played in Paraguay.

Career
An attacking midfielder from Valdivia, Chile, as a youth player Alderete was with club San Luis. In his homeland, he played for Huachipato, Deportes Concepción, O'Higgins, Fernández Vial and Deportes Valdivia.  

After his retirement, he went on playing football at amateur level for clubs such as Virginio Gómez and Atlético Merino

Personal life
He graduated as a topographer.

References

External links
 
 
 

1990 births
Living people
People from Valdivia
Chilean footballers
Chilean expatriate footballers
C.D. Huachipato footballers
Deportes Concepción (Chile) footballers
O'Higgins F.C. footballers
C.D. Arturo Fernández Vial footballers
Deportes Valdivia footballers
Primera B de Chile players
Chilean Primera División players
Segunda División Profesional de Chile players
Chilean expatriate sportspeople in Paraguay
Expatriate footballers in Paraguay
Association football midfielders